Leo A. Glavine (born 1948) is a Canadian politician, who represented the electoral district of Kings West in the Nova Scotia House of Assembly from 2003 until his retirement from politics in 2021. He is a member of the Liberals.

Early life
Glavine was born in Grand Falls-Windsor, Newfoundland and Labrador. He graduated from St. Francis Xavier University. Spent 30 years working at West Kings District High School in Auburn, Nova Scotia, as a public school teacher and high school administrator.

Political career
Glavine ran for the Liberal nomination in the riding of Kings West in 2003. He was elected in the 2003 provincial election and subsequently re-elected in the 2006, 2009, 2013 and 2017 provincial elections.

On October 22, 2013, Glavine was appointed to the Executive Council of Nova Scotia where he served as Minister of Health and Wellness, Minister of Seniors and the Chair of the Senior Citizens’ Secretariat.

On June 15, 2017, premier Stephen McNeil shuffled his cabinet, moving Glavine to Minister of Communities, Culture and Heritage, Minister of Seniors, and Minister of the Voluntary Sector.

Electoral record

|-
 
|Liberal
|Leo Glavine
|align="right"|4,190
|align="right"|52.45
|align="right"|-21.86
|-

|Progressive Conservative
|Chris Palmer
|align="right"|3,015
|align="right"|37.74
|align="right"|21.65
|-

|New Democratic Party
|Cheryl Burbidge
|align="right"|536
|align="right"|6.71
|align="right"|-0.9
|-

|}

|-
 
|Liberal
|Leo Glavine
|align="right"|5,890
|align="right"|74.31
|align="right"|+13.46
|-

|Progressive Conservative
|Jody Alan Frowley
|align="right"|1,275
|align="right"|16.09
|align="right"|-4.22
|-

|New Democratic Party
| Robert K. (Bob) Landry
|align="right"|603
|align="right"|7.61
|align="right"|-9.42
|-

|}

|-
 
|Liberal
|Leo Glavine
|align="right"|4,996
|align="right"|60.85
|align="right"|
|-

|Progressive Conservative
|Chris Palmer
|align="right"|1,668
|align="right"|20.31
|align="right"|
|-

|New Democratic Party
|Carol Tobin
|align="right"|1,398
|align="right"|17.03
|align="right"|
|-

|}

|-
 
|Liberal
|Leo Glavine
|align="right"|3940
|align="right"|46.67
|align="right"|
|-

|Progressive Conservative
|John Prall
|align="right"|2801
|align="right"|33.18
|align="right"|
|-

|New Democratic Party
|Greg Hubbert
|align="right"|1590
|align="right"|18.83
|align="right"|
|-

|}

|-
 
|Liberal
|Leo Glavine
|align="right"|3045
|align="right"|36.91
|align="right"|
|-

|Progressive Conservative
|Jon Carey
|align="right"|2935
|align="right"|35.58
|align="right"|
|-

|New Democratic Party
|Greg Hubbert
|align="right"|2269
|align="right"|27.51
|align="right"|
|}

Personal life
He is married and has three sons.

References

External links
 Members of the Nova Scotia Legislative Assembly
 Liberal caucus profile

1948 births
Canadian schoolteachers
Nova Scotia Liberal Party MLAs
Living people
Members of the Executive Council of Nova Scotia
Nova Scotia Ministers of Health
21st-century Canadian politicians
People from Kings County, Nova Scotia
St. Francis Xavier University alumni